R. fulgida may refer to:

 Racocetra fulgida, an arbuscular mycorrhizal fungus
 Rudbeckia fulgida, a plant native to eastern North America
 Ruellia fulgida, a wild petunia